This is a list of members of the South Australian House of Assembly from 1924 to 1927, as elected at the 1924 state election:

 Barossa Liberal MHA William Hague died on 9 October 1924. Liberal candidate Henry Crosby won the resulting by-election on 22 November.
 Port Adelaide Labor MHA John Price resigned on 21 April 1925. Labor candidate John Stanley Verran won the resulting by-election on 20 June.
 East Torrens Labor MHA Harry Kneebone resigned on 30 September 1925 to contest the 1925 federal election. Liberal candidate Walter Hamilton won the resulting by-election on 28 November.
 Yorke Peninsula Liberal MHA Peter Allen died on 22 October 1925. Liberal candidate Edward Giles won the resulting by-election on 20 January 1926.
 Stanley Liberal MHA Sir Henry Barwell resigned on 17 December 1925. Liberal candidate John Lyons won the resulting by-election on 16 March 1926.
 Adelaide Labor MHA John Gunn resigned on 28 August 1926. Labor candidate Herbert George won the resulting by-election on 21 September.

Members of South Australian parliaments by term
20th-century Australian politicians